Marc Jeannerod (15 December 1935 – 1 July 2011) was a neurologist, a neurophysiologist and an internationally recognized expert in cognitive neuroscience and experimental psychology. His research focuses on the cognitive and neurophysiological mechanisms underpinning motor control, motor cognition, the sense of agency, and more recently language and social cognition. Jeannerod's work bridges with elegance and rigor various levels of analysis, ranging from neuroscience to philosophy of mind, with clear implications for the understanding of a number of psychiatric and neurological disorders, especially schizophrenia.

Background
Marc Jeannerod studied Medicine at Claude Bernard University Lyon 1, France, and specialized in Neurology. He was awarded his MD degree in 1965. He got his research training in experimental medicine, studying the neurobiology of sleep under the supervision of Michel Jouvet, one of the discoverers of REM sleep. After his medical degree, Jeannerod became a research assistant in the Department of Anatomy at the University of California at Los Angeles, and then at the Massachusetts Institute of Technology with Hans-Lucas Teuber in the Department of Psychology. He subsequently became a professor of physiology at the University Claude Bernard Medical School in Lyon and headed the unit Vision and Motricity of the National Institute of Health and the Medical research (INSERM) until 1997. He then founded and headed the Institute for Cognitive Sciences of the National Center for Scientific Research (CNRS) until 2003.

Jeannerod was a member of the French Academy of Sciences. He was appointed Knight of the Légion d'honneur in July 2008. He left behind a wife and four children upon his death.

Editorial duties

Jeannerod was the chief editor of Neuropsychologia for ten years. He served on the editorial boards of several scientific journals, including NeuroImage, European Journal of Neuroscience, European Journal of Physiology, NeuroReport, Physiological Reviews, Journal of Motor Behavior, Perception, Cognition, Behavioural Brain Research, and Experimental Brain Research. He had been the president of the European Brain and Behaviour Society and was at the time of his death the president elect of the European Society for Philosophy and Psychology.

Academic achievements
Marc Jeannerod's early work in neurophysiology and clinical neuropsychology has significantly contributed to new concepts that have impacted on the field of cognitive motor control and motor cognition, including motor imagery, and have led to new vistas for the understanding of higher-order motor disorders. Specifically, he has conducted a number of empirical investigations of clinical disorders including those of bimanual coordination, apraxia and sensorimotor transformation deficits, motor neglect, anarchic hand syndrome, and imitation.

More recently, studies conducted in Jeannerod's INSERM laboratory and CNRS Institute for Cognitive Science (French: institut des sciences cognitives) led him to advance an original account of the simulation theory in the context of motor cognition and motor imagery.  This theory states that an action involves a covert stage, corresponding to its pragmatic representation, which includes its goal, the means to achieve it, and its consequences. Further, such pragmatic representation may be activated under a variety of conditions in relation to action, either self-intended or perceived from other individuals.  Even though this process may have a conscious counterpart (one can consciously generate a mental image), most of its generation occurs at the covert level. One persuasive source of evidence in support of this view comes from studies using transcranial magnetic stimulation that show that the mere observation of grasping movements results in the specific modulation of motor-evoked potentials.

Books
 Jeannerod, M. (2011). La Fabrique des idées. Odile Jacob Sciences. Paris. 
 Jeannerod, M. (2006). Motor cognition: What actions tell the Self. Oxford University Press.
 Jacob, P. & Jeannerod, M. (2003). Ways of Seeing: The Scope and Limits of Visual Cognition. Oxford University Press.
 Jeannerod, M. (2002). Le Cerveau intime. Paris: Editions Odile Jacob.
 Jeannerod, M. (2002). La Nature de l'esprit. Paris: Editions Odile Jacob.
 Jeannerod, M. (1997). The Cognitive Neuroscience of Action. Wiley-Blackwell.
 Jeannerod, M., & Grafman, J. (1997). Handbook of Neuropsychology, Volume 11. Elsevier Science.
 Jeannerod, M. (1996). De la physiologie mentale: Histoire des relations entre la psychologie et la biologie. Paris: Editions Odile Jacob.
 Jeannerod, M. (1988). The Neural and Behavioural Organization of Goal-Directed Movements. Oxford University Press.
 Jeannerod, M. (1987). Neurophysiological & Neuropsychological Aspects of Spatial Neglect. Elsevier BV.
 Jeannerod, M. (1985). The Brain Machine: The Development of Neurophysiological Thought. Harvard University Press.

Selected publications

See also
 Cognitive Science
 Neuropsychology
 Psychiatry
 Motor cognition
 Mental Practice of Action
 Motor imagery
 Neuroscience
 Neurophysiology
 Sense of agency
 Schizophrenia
 Experimental psychology

References

External links
 Interview with Marc Jeannerod
 Institute for Cognitive Science, CNRS, Lyon, France
 University Claude Bernard
 French Academy of Science

2011 deaths
French neuroscientists
Members of the French Academy of Sciences
French psychologists
Behavioral neuroscientists
1935 births